Joseph Peter Grace Jr. (May 25, 1913 – April 19, 1995) was an American industrialist who was president of the diversified chemical company, W. R. Grace & Co., for 48 years, making him the longest serving CEO of a public company.

Born in Manhasset, New York, he succeeded his father, Joseph Peter Grace Sr. (1872–1950), as President and CEO of W. R. Grace and Company in 1945 when his father suffered a stroke. The firm was founded by his grandfather William R. Grace, the first Roman Catholic to be elected Mayor of New York City. His maternal grandfather was Charles B. Macdonald, a major figure in early American golf who built the first 18-hole course in the United States.

Personal life
According to a National Review article, "Grace was the kind of man who, at age seventy, Indian-wrestled fellow chairmen of the board at his desk, showered in the evening to save time getting to work in the morning, wore a Beretta pistol (for terrorists), and, as a conservative Democrat, took out a full-page ad in The New York Times to support President Ronald Reagan's tax cuts."

He married Margaret Fennelly in 1941, and the couple remained together until his death.

Grace was a Roman Catholic.

Politics

In the  Kennedy administration, J. Peter Grace was head of the Commerce Department Committee on the Alliance for Progress.
President Reagan, in announcing the selection of J. Peter Grace to lead the Grace Commission on waste and inefficiency in the Federal government, said:
We have a problem that's been 40 years in the making, and we have to find ways to solve it. And I didn't want to ruin your appetites, so I waited till now to tell you this, but during the hour we're together here eating and talking, the Government has spent $83 million. And by the way, that includes the price of your lunch. [Laughter] Milton Friedman is right. There really is no such thing as a free lunch. The interest on our debt for the last hour was about $10 million of that.

In selecting your Committee, we didn't care whether you were Democrats or Republicans. Starting with Peter Grace, we just wanted to get the very best people we could find, and I think we were successful.

I'll repeat to you today what I said a week ago when I announced Peter's appointment: Be bold. We want your team to work like tireless bloodhounds. Don't leave any stone unturned in your search to root out inefficiency.

Grace, a Democrat, was asked what he would say to the campaign theme of Walter Mondale, the 1984 Democratic Presidential candidate, that higher taxes would be required to ease the deficit regardless of who wins the November election.

"I'd tell him he's nuts," Grace said. "He's wrong. He's wrong."

Awards and memberships
In 1967, he was awarded the Laetare Medal by the University of Notre Dame. In 1984, Grace received The Hundred Year Association of New York's Gold Medal Award "in recognition of outstanding contributions to the City of New York." That year, he also received the S. Roger Horchow Award for Greatest Public Service by a Private Citizen, an award given out annually by Jefferson Awards, and the Golden Plate Award of the American Academy of Achievement. Grace was a leader in the American Association of the Sovereign Military Order of Malta. Grace was a member of the conservative American organization the Council for National Policy.

References

External links
 J. Peter Grace – SourceWatch 
 W. R. Grace & Co. (grace.com)

1913 births
1995 deaths
American polo players
American Roman Catholics
American people of Irish descent
Knights of Malta
Businesspeople from New York (state)
Yale University alumni
New York (state) Democrats
Laetare Medal recipients
People from Manhasset, New York
20th-century American businesspeople